Federal Highway 182 (Carretera Federal 182) is a Federal Highway of Mexico. The highway travels from San Juan Bautista Tuxtepec, Oaxaca in the east to Teotitlán de Flores Magón, Oaxaca in the west.

References

182